Pavel Pavlovich Kosolapov (born February 27, 1980 in Serafimovichsky District, Volgograd Oblast, Russia) is an alleged ethnic Russian islamic terrorist sometimes referenced as "Russian Bin Laden". According to Russian security agency he was the main organizer of the February 2004 Moscow Metro bombing, 2007 Nevsky Express bombing and many smaller terrorist acts in Samara, Voronesh and Moscow Oblast. According to some versions he is also responsible for the 2009 Nevsky Express bombing.

References 

1980 births
Living people
People from Serafimovichsky District
Converts to Islam
Russian Islamists